Boswellia bullata is a species of plant in the Burseraceae family. It is endemic to Yemen.  Its natural habitats are subtropical or tropical dry forests and rocky areas.

References

Endemic flora of Socotra
bullata
Vulnerable plants
Taxonomy articles created by Polbot